Adam Horowitz is an actor and screenwriter.

Adam Horowitz may also refer to:

 Adam Horowitz (journalist), co-editor of Mondoweiss

See also 
Adam Horovitz (disambiguation)